Japanese football in 1934.

National team

Results

Players statistics

Births
March 3 - Yasuo Takamori
April 21 - Masao Uchino
April 21 - Kenzo Ohashi
July 5 - Yoshio Furukawa
August 13 - Gyoji Matsumoto

External links

 
Seasons in Japanese football